Chandravarman (4th century CE) was a king of the Pushkarana kingdom in the Bankura district of West Bengal. The kingdom was established shortly before the advent of the Gupta Empire, and was located to the west of the Samatata kingdom of eastern Bengal. 

Chandravarman was the son of king Simhavarmana. He extended his kingdom to the east towards the Faridpur district.

According to the inscription on the Allahabad pillar by Gupta emperor Samudragupta, Chandravarman was defeated by Samudragupta and the area became a part of the Gupta Empire:

Alternatively, the Chandravarman named in the inscription could be a ruler named on an inscription found in Mandsaur in Malwa.

The defeat of Chandravarman paved the way to Gupta suzerainty over Bengal. 

Chandra Barma, king of Malwa, invaded Mallabhoom in the fifth century A. D. [As Susunia Inscriptions (discovered by N. N. Basu) and H. P. Sastri's article (in the Antiquary) Show] Samudra Gupta conquest in the fourth century A. D.

References

Sources

4th-century Indian monarchs